This is a list of notable Slovak Americans, including both original immigrants who obtained American citizenship and their American descendants.

To be included in this list, the person must have a Wikipedia article showing they are Slovak American or must have references showing they are Slovak American and are notable. Some of this list might have Slovak immigrant ancestors of German, Hungarian, or Romani descent.

List

Arts, culture, and entertainment

 Jon Bon Jovi – rock musician, singer, songwriter and actor (paternal grandmother of Slovak descent)
 Tom Selleck - actor (father was immigrant from eastern Slovakia)
 David Boreanaz – actor (mother was half Slovak descent - actually Slovene)
 Jim Caviezel – film actor (paternal grandmother of Slovak descent)
 Scarlett Chorvat – film and television actress
 Alexandra Daddario – actress
 Matthew Daddario – actor
 Laco Déczi (Ladislav Déči) – Slovak-American jazz trumpeter and composer, leader of Jazz Celula New York
 Steve Ditko – comic book artist and writer, co-creator of the Marvel Comics heroes Spider-Man and Doctor Strange
 Jackie Evancho - singer
 Moritz Fuerst – artist employed with United States Mint in the 19th century
 Dave Grohl – rock musician, multi-instrumentalist, singer-songwriter, and film director, of part Slovak descent
 James Haven – actor and producer
 Steve Ihnat – actor, director
 Justin Jedlica – "human Ken doll"
 Angelina Jolie – actress, former fashion model and Goodwill Ambassador for the UN Refugee Agency; daughter of Jon Voight (paternal grandfather of Slovak descent)
 Bianca Kajlich – actress, her father, Dr. Aurel Jan "Relo" Kajlich, was a Slovak immigrant
 Candace Kroslak – actress
 Austin Mahone – singer and songwriter
 Victor S. Mamatey – professor of history, active in Slovak immigrant organizations in the United States
 Luba Mason – singer, actress, dancer and songwriter
 Pola Negri – actress, her father, Juraj Chalupec, was a Slovak immigrant
 Paul Newman – actor and film director (his mother was Slovak)
 John Ondrasik – musician, performing as "Five for Fighting"
 Emil Sitka – actor, parents were Slovak immigrants
 Ivan Reitman – movie director (born in Slovakia)
 Jason Reitman – movie director (son of Ivan Reitman)
 Robert Urich – actor
 Katarina Van Derham – model, actress, and publisher
 Jon Voight – actor (paternal grandfather was a Slovak immigrant from Košice; paternal grandmother was also of Slovak descent)
 Andy Warhol – artist, film director (his parents were immigrants from small village Miková in eastern Slovakia)
 Kiernan Shipka
 Dove Cameron

Business
 John Dopyera – inventor, entrepreneur
 John D. Hertz – businessman, thoroughbred racehorse owner and breeder, and philanthropist, one of the earliest owners of The Hertz Corporation (born in small village in central Slovakia)
 iJustine – blogger
 Travis Kalanick – founder of Uber (paternal grandfather was a Slovak immigrant from Valaškovce)
Frank Lowy – owner and manager of Westfield-branded shopping centers
 Anna Olson – restaurant owner

Law and politics
 Michael Badnarik – software engineer, political figure, and radio talk show host
 Mark Critz – U.S. Congressman
 William T. Dzurilla – international attorney and law clerk to Justice Byron White of the United States Supreme Court
 Carolyn Forché – professor, poet, editor, and human rights advocate
 John Mica – Republican former member of the U.S. House of Representatives from Florida
 Joseph M. Gaydos – Democratic member of the U.S. House of Representatives from Pennsylvania
 Peter P. Jurchak – legal counsel for the United Mine Workers 
 John Katko – U.S. Representative from New York 
 Vincent Obsitnik – diplomat born in Slovakia, former Ambassador of the United States of America to Slovakia
 Tom Ridge – Republican, 43rd Governor of Pennsylvania and 1st Secretary of United States Department of Homeland Security
John Roberts – Chief Justice of the United States
 Philip Ruppe – U.S. Representative
 Claudine Schneider – U.S. Representative from Rhode Island
 Joe Sestak – U.S. Representative, Democrat, Pennsylvania 7th District; retired US Naval vice-admiral; democratic presidential candidate in 2020 election
 John Slezak - was United States Under Secretary of the Army from 1954 to 1955
 Judy Baar Topinka – Republican politician in Illinois
 Jesse Ventura – 38th Governor of Minnesota, wrestler, television personality
 Pete Visclosky – U.S. Representative for Indiana's 1st congressional district

Military
 Štefan Banič – constructor of a parachute-like device which he donated to the US Army, but was not used
 Joseph E. Durik – Seaman Apprentice of United States Naval Reserve
 Matej Kocak – Sergeant of the United States Marine Corps; double Medal of Honor recipient in World War I
 Richard Marcinko – U.S. Navy SEAL and founder of SEAL Team 6
 Michael Strank – Sergeant of the United States Marine Corps, one of the six flag-raisers who helped raise the second U.S. flag atop Mount Suribachi on February 23, 1945

Religion
 Joseph Victor Adamec – bishop of the Roman Catholic Diocese of Altoona–Johnstown
 David A. Bednar – member of the Quorum of the Twelve Apostles, The Church of Jesus Christ of Latter-day Saints (LDS Church)
 Teresa Demjanovich – Roman Catholic nun
 John Hardon – priest, author, theologian, community leader
 Michael Novak – was an American Catholic philosopher, journalist, novelist, and diplomat
 Jaroslav Pelikan – scholar of the history of Christianity, Christian theology and medieval intellectual history
 David Allen Zubik – the twelfth and current bishop of Roman Catholic Diocese of Pittsburgh, Pennsylvania

Science and medicine
 Gene Cernan – NASA astronaut, naval aviator, electrical engineer, aeronautical engineer, and fighter pilot
 John Dopyera – inventor of the resonator acoustic guitar
 Mike Fincke – NASA astronaut, International Space Station commander
 Daniel Carleton Gajdusek – Nobel Prize winner for discovery of viruses with prolonged incubation periods
 Ivan Alexander Getting – electrical engineer, inventor of GPS
 Lars Krutak - anthropologist, writer, photographer, and curator
 Jozef Murgaš – inventor, architect, botanist, painter, US patriot, and Roman Catholic priest
 Douglas D. Osheroff – physicist
 Ján Vilček – biomedical scientist, educator, inventor and philanthropist; currently a professor in the Department of Microbiology at the New York University School of Medicine and President of the Vilcek Foundation

Sports

 Joe Baksi – former professional boxer, heavyweight
 Chuck Bednarik – former professional American football player for the Philadelphia Eagles of the NFL
 George Blanda – former quarterback and kicker for the Oakland Raiders and Houston Oilers
 Jeff Bzdelik – basketball coach; currently an assistant with the Houston Rockets, former assistant with the Memphis Grizzlies, and former head coach of the Denver Nuggets, U.S. Air Force Academy, University of Colorado, and Wake Forest University
 Robbie Ftorek – former professional ice hockey player
 Bill Hartack – jockey
 Al Hostak – former professional boxer, middleweight
 Scott Kazmir – MLB player
 Matthew Knies – ice hockey player
 Andy Kosco – former baseball player
 Jack Kralick – former pitcher for Washington Senators and Cleveland Indians
 Leslie Krichko – Olympic skier
 Johnny Kucab – pitcher for Philadelphia Athletics in 1940s and 1950s
 Kyle Kuric – professional basketball player in Spain, currently with Gran Canaria
 John Kundla – professional NBA coach, member of Naismith Memorial Basketball Hall of Fame. (His father Ján was Slovak immigrant)
 Joseph Lapchick – former basketball player and coach
 Pete Latzo – boxer
 Bethanie Mattek-Sands – professional tennis player
 Stan Mikita – former professional ice hockey player
 Andy Pafko – baseball center fielder for the Chicago Cubs (1943–51), Brooklyn Dodgers (1951–52) and Milwaukee Braves (1953–59)
 Kelly Pavlik – undefeated WBO/World Boxing Council middleweight boxing champion
 Mike Piazza – professional baseball player
 Nicole Rajičová – figure skater
 George Shuba – former outfielder for the Brooklyn Dodgers
 Brian Sikorski – baseball relief pitcher
 Paul Stastny – professional ice hockey player
 Peter Šťastný – former professional ice hockey player
 Yan Stastny – professional ice hockey player
 Dean Talafous – former professional ice hockey player
 Scott Touzinsky – volleyball player
 Elmer Valo – right fielder, coach and scout in Major League Baseball
 Jason Varitek – former captain and catcher for Boston Red Sox (1997–2011)

See also
 List of Slovaks
 Slovak Americans

References

Slovak
 
Americans
Slovak